Charles Justin "C. J." Aiken (born September 27, 1990) is an American professional basketball player who last played for Taoyuan Pauian Archiland of the Taiwanese Super Basketball League. He played college basketball for Saint Joseph's University.

College career
In his three-year college career at Saint Joseph's, Aiken played 98 games (82 starts) while averaging 9.6 points, 5.0 rebounds and 3.3 blocks in 30.2 minutes per game. Over his stint, he was one of the top shot-blockers in the NCAA as he earned Atlantic 10 Defensive Player of the Year honors in 2011–12.

In April 2013, Aiken declared for the NBA draft, forgoing his final year of college eligibility.

Professional career
After going undrafted in the 2013 NBA draft, Aiken joined the Sacramento Kings for the Las Vegas Summer League in July and the team's mini-camp in September.

On November 1, 2013, Aiken was selected by the Texas Legends with the fifth overall pick in the 2013 NBA Development League Draft. Three days later, he was traded to the Erie BayHawks in exchange for Terrel Harris. He managed just six games for the BayHawks in 2013–14 as he averaged 4.7 points and 3.8 rebounds per game.

On January 27, 2015, Aiken was reacquired by the BayHawks. However, he was waived two days later before appearing in a game for them.

On September 7, 2015, Aiken signed with Wilki Morskie Szczecin of the Polish Basketball League.

In March 2017, Aiken signed with Bendigo Braves South East Australian Basketball League (SEABL) club based in Bendigo, Victoria. Aiken averaged 20.2 points, 12.4 rebounds, 2.0 assist, and 1.6 blocks. Aiken won the leagues defensive player of the year. He finished second in the league for rebounds per game with 12.4 per game as well as second overall for boards and third for defensive boards.

In September 2017, Aiken signed with Czarni Słupsk a Polish basketball team, based in Słupsk, playing in Tauron Basket Liga. He averaged 11.7 points, 8.7 rebounds, and 1.3 blocks.

In January 2018, Aiken signed with Niagara River Lions. A Canadian professional basketball team based in St. Catharines, Ontario, that competes in the Canadian Elite Basketball League.

In March 2018, Aiken signed with the Kia Picanto of the Philippine Basketball Association as their import for the 2018 PBA Commissioner's Cup.

In October 2018, Aiken signed with Tuři Svitavy that plays in the top professional Czech basketball league, the NBL.

In August 2019, Aiken signed with PVSK-Panthers, for sponsorship reasons known as PVSK-Veolia or simply Pécs.  It is the oldest non-Budapest based basketball club playing in the NB I/A.

In July 2020, Aiken signed a one-year contract with Hungarian club Kaposvári KK that plays in the NB I/A. On January 8, 2022, Aiken signed with Taoyuan Pauian Archiland of the Taiwanese Super Basketball League.

References

External links
NBA D-League profile
RealGM profile

1990 births
Living people
American expatriate basketball people in Canada
American expatriate basketball people in the Czech Republic
American expatriate basketball people in Hungary
American expatriate basketball people in the Philippines
American expatriate basketball people in Poland
American expatriate basketball people in Taiwan
American men's basketball players
Basketball players from Pennsylvania
Terrafirma Dyip players
Erie BayHawks (2008–2017) players
Niagara River Lions players
People from Conshohocken, Pennsylvania
Philippine Basketball Association imports
Power forwards (basketball)
PVSK Panthers players
Saint Joseph's Hawks men's basketball players
Sportspeople from Montgomery County, Pennsylvania
Tuři Svitavy players
Kaposvári KK players
Pauian Archiland basketball players
Super Basketball League imports